Joseph Guiste (born 4 April 1959) is a Dominican cricketer. He played in one first-class and five List A matches for the Windward Islands in 1979/80 and 1980/81.

See also
 List of Windward Islands first-class cricketers

References

External links
 

1959 births
Living people
Dominica cricketers
Windward Islands cricketers